Sessay railway station served the village of Sessay, North Yorkshire, England from 1841 to 1964 on the East Coast Main Line.

History 
The station opened on 1 August 1841 by the Great North of England Railway. The station was rebuilt from 1942 during the widening of the railway line in World War II, completed in May 1943. It was closed to passengers from 15 September 1958 and closed completely from 10 August 1964.

References

External links 

Disused railway stations in North Yorkshire
Former North Eastern Railway (UK) stations
Railway stations in Great Britain opened in 1841
Railway stations in Great Britain closed in 1958
1841 establishments in England
1964 disestablishments in England